Dada Gallotti (born 8 April 1935) is an Italian actress.

Born in Milan as Alda Gallotti,  she was one of the most active character actresses in the 1960s and 1970s. She appeared in several Spaghetti Western films under the pseudonym Diana Garson. She retired from acting in the early 1980s.

Selected filmography

 Romulus and the Sabines (1961)
 The Changing of the Guard (1962)
 Taras Bulba, the Cossack (1962)
 Samson vs. the Giant King (1964)
 Hercules and the Treasure of the Incas (1964)
 Left Handed Johnny West (1965)
 Night of Violence (1965)
 Johnny Yuma (1966)
 Lola Colt (1967)
 Vengeance is Mine (1968)
 Zenabel (1969)
 Flashback (1969)
 Diary of a Telephone Operator (1969)
 Zorro in the Court of England (1969)
 Heads or Tails (1969)
 I due maghi del pallone (1970)
 Frankenstein 80 (1972)
 La bella Antonia, prima monica e poi dimonia (1972)
 God in Heaven... Arizona on Earth (1972)
 Special Killers (1973)
 Sgarro alla camorra (1973)
 Man with the Golden Winchester (1973)
 Reflections in Black (1975)
 Confessions of a Frustrated Housewife (1976)
 The Best (1976)
 Vieni avanti cretino (1982)

References

External links

Living people
1935 births
Actresses from Milan
20th-century Italian women
21st-century Italian women